Peter James Doocy (born July 21, 1987) is an American journalist and a White House correspondent for Fox News.

Early life and education
Doocy is the eldest child of Steve Doocy and Kathy Gerrity. His father is a co-host of the morning show Fox & Friends.

He graduated from Villanova University with a Bachelor of Arts degree in political science in 2009. While in college, he contributed to Fox News as a Palestra.net reporter.

Career
Doocy was hired by Fox News in 2009 after graduating from college; he spent time in New York and Chicago before relocating to Washington, D.C., in 2010.

In 2014, Doocy obtained an exclusive TV interview with former Navy SEAL Robert J. O'Neill, who claims to have fired the shot that killed Osama bin Laden. That special reportedly had the highest ratings of any documentary in Fox News history.

In October 2017, Doocy asked Senator John McCain (R-AZ), "Has your relationship with the president frayed to the point that you're not going to support anything that he comes to you and asks for?" McCain responded, "Why would you say something that stupid? Why would you ask something that dumb, huh? ... That's a dumb question."

He was a campaign reporter in the 2018 midterm elections.

White House correspondent 
Doocy reported on the 2020 Democratic Party presidential primaries and the presidential campaign of the party's nominee, Joe Biden. In January 2021, Fox News named Doocy as a White House correspondent to cover the incoming Biden administration. He quickly established a reputation for clashing with the president and White House Press Secretary Jen Psaki. Several Doocy–Psaki exchanges became Internet memes.

After covering a White House East Room meeting focused on economic competitiveness and inflation, a departing Doocy called out to Biden: "Do you think inflation is a political liability in the midterms?" Lowering his voice, and turning slightly away from the hot mic beneath him; as ABC reported, "Biden responded with sarcasm, 'It's a great asset — more inflation.' Then he shook his head and added, 'What a stupid son of a bitch.'" Some sources have speculated about whether or not Biden intended to have his comments picked up by the microphone. Biden called Doocy within an hour to clear the air. According to Doocy, Biden said, "It's nothing personal, pal."

Personal life 
In April 2021, Doocy married Hillary Vaughn, a Fox Business correspondent. On February 1, 2023, the couple had their first child.

References

External links

 Fox News – Peter Doocy Bio

1987 births
Living people
Television personalities from Washington, D.C.
Villanova University alumni
American people of Swedish descent
American people of Irish descent
American television reporters and correspondents
Fox News people
American male journalists
21st-century American journalists